The Two Rivers Way is a 20-mile (32km) long-distance footpath through Somerset, England from Congresbury to Keynsham that follows the River Yeo and River Chew to the River Avon.

The footpath passes through the villages of Chew Stoke, Chew Magna and Compton Dando.

References

Footpaths in Somerset